Sunifred II of Cerdanya (915 - Cuxa, 968) was count of Cerdanya (927-968), Conflent (927-968), and Besalú (957-968).

Origins

Son of Miró II of Cerdanya and Ava of Cerdanya, he inherited the county of Cerdanya from his father, and that of Besalú from his brother, Wilfred II of Besalú.

Political life

In 927, on the death of his father, he received as an inheritance the counties of Cerdanya and Conflent. Until 941 the widowed countess Ava presided over him as regent.

In 951 he traveled to Rome, where he received by way of papal bulls a number of privileges for the monastery of Santa Maria de Ripoll and for Lagrasse Abbey. He promoted the construction of the church of Saint-Michel-de-Cuxa, consecrated in 953, and of the monastery. He also protected the monastery of Sant Pere de Rodes.

Titles and successors

In 957 on the death of his brother Wilfred II of Besalú, he was appointed his brother's heir, thus once again uniting the dominions of his father under the same rule. In a revolt of his vassals he intervened to bring peace among them, decreeing the confiscation of rebel property. He was succeeded by his brother Miró III.

Counts of Cerdanya
Counts of Besalú
915 births
968 deaths
10th-century Catalan people
10th-century Visigothic people